The 2009 Cincinnati Masters (also known as the Western & Southern Financial Group Masters and Western & Southern Financial Group Women's Open for sponsorship reasons) was a tennis tournament played on outdoor hard courts. It was the 108th edition of the Cincinnati Masters, and was part of the ATP Masters Series of the 2009 ATP World Tour, and of the Premier Series of the 2009 WTA Tour. Both the men's and the women's events were held at the Lindner Family Tennis Center in Mason, near Cincinnati, Ohio, United States, with the men playing from August 17 through August 23, 2009, and the women from August 10 through August 16, 2009. It was the third women's event and the fifth men's event on the 2009 US Open Series. Former world No. 1 Kim Clijsters made her return to the Sony Ericsson WTA Tour in Cincinnati.

WTA entrants

Seeds

 1 As of August 3, 2009

Other entrants
The following players received wildcards into the singles main draw:
  Kim Clijsters
  Maria Kirilenko
  Meghann Shaughnessy

The following players received entry from the qualifying draw:
  Kateryna Bondarenko
  Olga Govortsova
  Tatjana Malek
  Ayumi Morita
  Melanie Oudin
  Urszula Radwańska
  Yaroslava Shvedova
  Yanina Wickmayer

ATP entrants

Seeds

 Seedings are based on the rankings of  August 10, 2009

Other entrants
The following players received wildcards into the singles main draw
  Robby Ginepri
  John Isner
  Wayne Odesnik
  Marat Safin

The following players received entry from the qualifying draw:
  Simone Bolelli
  Chris Guccione
  Jan Hernych
  Łukasz Kubot
  Ivan Ljubičić
  Lu Yen-hsun
  Mikhail Youzhny

The following players received the lucky loser spot:
  Julien Benneteau

Finals

Men's singles

 Roger Federer defeated  Novak Djokovic 6–1, 7–5.
It was Federer's fourth title of the year and 61st overall. It was his third win at the event, also winning in 2005 and 2007.

Women's singles

 Jelena Janković defeated  Dinara Safina 6–4, 6–2.
It was Janković's second title of the year and 11th overall.

Men's doubles

 Daniel Nestor /  Nenad Zimonjić defeated  Bob Bryan /  Mike Bryan, 3–6, 7–6(7–2), [15–13].

Women's doubles

 Cara Black /  Liezel Huber defeated  Nuria Llagostera Vives /  María José Martínez Sánchez, 6–3, 0–6, [10–2].

External links
 
 Association of Tennis Professionals (ATP) tournament profile

 
Western and Southern Financial Group Masters
Western and Southern Financial Group Women's Open
Western and Southern Financial Group Masters and Women's Open
Cincinnati Masters